Melinda Nadj Abonji (born 22 June 1968 in Bečej, Yugoslavia) is a Hungarian-Swiss writer, musician, and performance artist. Melinda Nadj Abonji was born in the Hungarian part of Vojvodina, in present-day Serbia. She came to Switzerland at the age of 5 to join her refugee parents.

After finishing her studies at the University of Zurich, she wrote a novel, Fly Away, Pigeon, based on her refugee experiences, which in 2010 won the German Book Prize and the Swiss Book Prize.

Works

English translations

References 

Living people
Swiss women writers
Hungarian women writers
1968 births
German Book Prize winners
Intakt Records artists
Swiss Book Prize winners